Benjamin Michael "Ben" Rattray (born June 16, 1980) is the founder and former CEO of the online petition website Change.org, which he founded in 2007. Rattray was included in the 2012 Time 100 list of the world's most influential people, listed as one of Fortunes 40 Under 40 rising young business leaders of 2012, and given the Commonwealth Club of California's 21st Century Visionary Award in 2014.

Personal life 

Rattray was born in 1980 in Santa Barbara, California, the son of Judy (née McCaffrey), a county sales manager at First American Title, and Michael Rattray, CEO of the Boys & Girls Club of Santa Barbara County. He has one older sibling, Zack, and three younger siblings, Lindsay, Nick, and Tyler.

At Dos Pueblos High School, Rattray was "sporty and handsome" and "a homecoming king". He wanted to grow up to be an investment banker, then retire at age 35 and go into politics.

Rattray attended Stanford University during the technology boom of the early 2000s, studying political science and economics. He changed career paths to focus on "the pursuit of effective collective action" after comments one of his brothers had made when revealing his homosexuality. He later attended the London School of Economics.

Rattray lives in San Francisco.

Change.org

Rattray launched Change.org from his house in 2007. The site has gone through multiple iterations, starting as a social network for social activism, changing into a cause-based blogging platform, then transitioning to a petition platform in 2011.

The goal of Change.org, according to Rattray, is to "change the balance of power between individuals and large organizations".

"The power unlocked when people have the capacity to more rapidly and effectively organize with others is unprecedented in human history", Rattray wrote in an e-mail to Change.org staff members. "But what's needed for this to be truly transformational is a solution that turns people-power from a force that is episodically realized to one that is deeply embedded in our political and social lives — something that makes people-power pervasive and sustained."

In February 2012, Rattray stated that Change.org was "growing more each month than the total we had in the first four years", with more than 10,000 petitions being started each month on the site, and that in 2011 the company's employees had grown from 20 to 100.

Change.org announced a $15 million round of investment led by the Omidyar Network in May 2013 and said its staff had grown to 170 people in 18 countries.

References

External links

1980 births
Living people
Businesspeople from San Francisco
Stanford University alumni
Alumni of the London School of Economics
People from Santa Barbara, California
American computer businesspeople
American technology chief executives
Businesspeople from the San Francisco Bay Area